Bauhinia divaricata, the bull hoof or Mexican orchid tree, is a species of flowering plant in the family Fabaceae. It is native to Mexico, Central America (except Panama), and the Caribbean.

References

divaricata
Flora of Mexico
Flora of Central America
Flora of Cuba
Flora of the Cayman Islands
Flora of Jamaica
Flora of Haiti
Flora of the Dominican Republic
Flora of the Leeward Islands
Flora of the Southwest Caribbean
Plants described in 1753
Taxa named by Carl Linnaeus